Moree railway station is located on the Mungindi line in New South Wales, Australia. It serves the town of Moree.

History

The current station opened in 1904, replacing the original station located to the north that opened on 1 April 1897 when the line was extended from Boggabri.

It served as the terminus of the line until it was extended to Garah on 29 September 1913 and ultimately Mungindi on 7 December 1914. Moree was also the junction station for the Boggabilla and Inverell lines.

The station is an island platform with two faces. In 2009, a timber building at the southern end of the platform was destroyed by fire.

Services
Moree is served by NSW TrainLink's daily Northern Tablelands Xplorer service operating to and from Sydney. NSW TrainLink also operates a coach service to and from Grafton.

References

External links

Moree station details Transport for New South Wales

Easy Access railway stations in New South Wales
North West Slopes
Railway stations in Australia opened in 1904
Regional railway stations in New South Wales
Moree, New South Wales